KZR or kzr may refer to:

 KZR, the IATA code for Zafer Airport, Altıntaş, Kütahya, Turkey
 kzr, the ISO 639-3 code for Karang language, Cameroon and Chad